Holland Hospital is a non-profit hospital located in the West Michigan lakeshore area. The hospital was founded in 1917 and it serves the greater Holland area and surrounding communities throughout Ottawa and Allegan counties. As of February 2014, Holland Hospital has a 189-bed main campus with more than 300 physicians, and a 2,000 member hospital staff that includes 550 registered nurses.

History

Holland Hospital was founded in 1917 in the home of a local doctor named Dr. Kremers. The hospital later underwent infrastructure expansions to meet the needs of a growing patient number. In 2000, the Lakeshore Medical Campus was opened on Holland's north side and it is home to Urgent Care and other departments and physician practices. In 2007, a 90,000-square-foot expansion to the hospital provided a new and expanded emergency room, intensive care unit, Special Care Nursery, and cardiac rehabilitation facility. In 2010, Holland Hospital opened a multi-use medical office building in Zeeland, named Holland Hospital Medical Building, serving people living or working east of the hospital.

In August 2013, the hospital opened its $10 million expansion of its orthopedic and neurosurgery unit with the 23,400-square-foot addition to the hospital. Room sizes were increased for orthopedic patients and 24 private rooms were created.

Financials

In January 2013, Moody's Investors Service assigned an A2 long-term rating to Holland Hospital's $37.0 million of Series 2013A fixed rate bonds to be issued through the Michigan Finance Authority.

Scholarships

The Holland Hospital Auxiliary awards annual scholarship for college students pursuing a degree in health care. Scholarships are available to college juniors and seniors with permanent residence in the greater Holland and Zeeland area.

See also

 List of hospitals in Michigan

References

1917 establishments in Michigan
Buildings and structures in Holland, Michigan
Hospitals in Michigan